Aïn Bessem District is a district of Bouïra Province, Algeria.

Municipalities
The district is further divided into 3 municipalities:
Aïn Bessem
Aïn El Hadjar 
Aïn Laloui

Districts of Bouïra Province